Ian Hanmore is a Scottish actor known for his role as the warlock Pyat Pree in the second season of the HBO series Game of Thrones.

Career
He also played Albert Flood in The Awakening, Margaret's Father in The Magdalene Sisters, Lord Ruthven in Mary Queen of Scots and Father Angelo in the 2006 Doctor Who episode "Tooth and Claw".

He played the Guide in James Graham's site specific piece "The Tour Guide" and has performed in a number of other stage productions including Chris Lee's "The Fall of the Peacock Throne" where he played Mohammad Mosaddeq. His most recent role was that of Joe Necchi in Untitled Production's adaptation of Alexander Trocchi's "Cain's Book".

He has voiced the Audiobook versions of a number of crime novels including work by James Oswald and Stuart MacBride.

Filmography

Film

Television

References

External links

Scottish male film actors
Scottish male stage actors
Scottish male television actors
Living people
Year of birth missing (living people)